Henry Smith was a Negro league second baseman in the 1940s.

Smith made his Negro leagues debut in 1942 with the Jacksonville Red Caps and the Chicago American Giants. He went on to play for the Indianapolis/Cincinnati Clowns through his final season in 1945.

References

External links
 and Seamheads

Place of birth missing
Place of death missing
Year of birth missing
Year of death missing
Chicago American Giants players
Indianapolis Clowns players
Jacksonville Red Caps players
Baseball second basemen